Zagryadskoye is a rural locality in Kosteltsevsky Selsoviet Rural Settlement, Kurchatovsky District, Kursk Oblast, Russia. Population:

Geography 
The village is located in the Prutishche River basin (in the basin of the Seym), 66.5 km from the Russia–Ukraine border, 48 km north-west of Kursk, 17.5 km north-west of the district center – the town Kurchatov, 6.5 km from the selsoviet center – Kosteltsevo.

 Climate
Zagryadskoye has a warm-summer humid continental climate (Dfb in the Köppen climate classification).

Transport 
Zagryadskoye is located 38 km from the federal route  Crimea Highway, 17 km from the road of regional importance  (Kursk – Lgov – Rylsk – border with Ukraine), 16 km from the road  (Lgov – Konyshyovka), 4.5 km from the road of intermunicipal significance  (38K-017 – Nikolayevka – Shirkovo), 1.5 km from the road  (38K-023 – Olshanka – Marmyzhi – 38K-017), 13.5 km from the nearest railway halt 565 km (railway line Navlya – Lgov-Kiyevsky).

The rural locality is situated 54.5 km from Kursk Vostochny Airport, 146 km from Belgorod International Airport and 258 km from Voronezh Peter the Great Airport.

References

Notes

Sources

Rural localities in Kurchatovsky District, Kursk Oblast